This is an alphabetical list of psychiatric medications used by psychiatrists and other physicians to treat mental illness or distress.

 The list is not exhaustive.
All mentioned drugs here are generic names.
 Not all drugs listed are used regularly in all countries.

A 
Acamprosate, Alprazolam, Amisulpride, Amitriptyline, Amoxapine, Amphetamine, Mixed Amphetamine Salts, Aripiprazole, Atomoxetine

B 
Benperidol, Bromazepam, Bupropion, Buspirone

C 
Calcium carbimide, Carbamazepine, Chloralhydrate, Chlordiazepoxide, Clorgiline, Chlorpromazine, Citalopram, Clomipramine, Clonazepam, Clonidine, Clozapine

D 
Desvenlafaxine, Dextroamphetamine, Diazepam, Disulfiram, Duloxetine

E 
Escitalopram, Eszopiclone

F 
Fluoxetine, Fluphenazine, Flurazepam, Fluvoxamine

G 
Gabapentin, Guanfacine

H 
Haloperidol

I 
Imipramine, Indalpine, Itopride

L 
Lamotrigine, Lemborexant, Levoamphetamine, Levomepromazine, Lisdexamfetamine, Lithium, Lorazepam, Loxapine, Lumateperone, Lurasidone

M 
Maprotiline, Melperone, Meprobamate, Mesoridazine, Methamphetamine, Methaqualone, Methylphenidate, Mianserin, Mirtazapine, Mixed Amphetamine Salts, Moclobemide, Modafinil

N 
Naltrexone, Nitrazepam, Nortriptyline

O 
Olanzapine, Oxazepam, Oxcarbazepine

P 
Paliperidone, Pargyline, Paroxetine, Perphenazine, Phenelzine, Phenytoin, Pipamperone, Pimavanserin, Pimozide, Pipotiazine, Pramipexole, Primidone, Prochlorperazine, Promethazine, Prothipendyl, Protriptyline

Q 
Quetiapine

R 
Reboxetine, Risperidone, Rozerem, Rubidium chloride

S 
Scopolamine, Selegiline, Sertraline, Sulfonmethane, Sulpiride

T 
Temazepam, Thioridazine, Thiothixene, Topiramate, Tranylcypromine, Trazodone, Triazolam, Trifluoperazine, Trimipramine

V 
Valbenazine, Valproate, Venlafaxine

Z 
Zaleplon, Zimelidine, Ziprasidone, Zolpidem, Zopiclone, Zotepine, Zuclopenthixol

See also 
 List of psychiatric drugs by condition treated

Medications, list of
Neuropharmacology